The Fish Grotto Seafood Restaurant, or simply Fish Grotto, was a seafood restaurant in Portland, Oregon. Established in 1891 as Zack's Oyster House, the business also operated a neighboring bar called Sand Bar at Fish Grotto, or simply Sand Bar. The restaurant stopped operating in January 2014.

See also

 List of defunct restaurants of the United States
 List of seafood restaurants

References

1891 establishments in Oregon
2014 disestablishments in Oregon
Defunct seafood restaurants in Portland, Oregon
Restaurants established in 1891
Restaurants disestablished in 2014